L. E. (Leland Exton) Modesitt Jr. (born 1943) is an American science fiction and fantasy author who has written over 75 novels. He is best known for the fantasy series The Saga of Recluce. By 2015 the 18 novels in the Recluce series had sold nearly three million copies. By 2019 there were 22 Recluce novels.

In addition to his novels, Modesitt has published technical studies and articles, columns, poetry, and a number of science fiction stories. His first short story, "The Great American Economy", was published in 1973 in Analog Science Fiction and Science Fact.  In 2008, he published his first collection of short stories, Viewpoints Critical: Selected Stories (Tor Books, 2008).

Early life
Modesitt was born in Denver, Colorado.  He graduated from Williams College in Massachusetts and lived in Washington, D.C. for almost 20 years while working as a political writer.

He has worked as a Navy pilot, lifeguard, delivery boy, unpaid radio disc jockey, real estate agent, market research analyst, director of research for a political campaign, legislative assistant for a Congressman, Director of Legislation and Congressional Relations for the United States Environmental Protection Agency, a consultant on environmental, regulatory, and communications issues, and a college lecturer and writer in residence.

Approach to writing
Modesitt has stated, “When all the research, all the writing group support, all the cheerleading, and all the angst fade away, and they should, the bottom line is simple: As a writer, you first must entertain your readers. To keep them beyond a quick and final read, you have to do more than that, whether it’s to educate them, make them feel, anger them by challenging their preconceptions—or all of that and more. But if you don’t entertain first, none of what else you do matters, because they won’t stay around.”

Bibliography

Major series
 The Saga of Recluce (1991–present)
 Spellsong Cycle (1997–2002)
 The Forever Hero (1987–1988)
 The Corean Chronicles (2002–2011)
 The Imager Portfolio (2009–2019)
The Grand Illusion   (2021–present)

Personal life
He met his current wife, Carol A. Modesitt, after moving to New Hampshire in 1989. Carol works as a professional opera singer and now acts as a professor at Southern Utah University. They relocated to Cedar City, Utah in 1993.

He has been married three times, and has six daughters and two sons.

References

External links
Recluce, The Official L. E. Modesitt, Jr. Fan Site (Formerly Recluce, the Official Modesitt Website)
L. E. Modesitt, Jr. – Official Website
L. E. Modesitt, Jr. at Tor Books
Official forum at IBDoF
 Interview with L. E. Modesitt, Jr. at SFFWorld.com

Recluce Wiki (archived) fictional universes of L. E. Modesitt Jr.
 Essay about Antiagon Fire – The Antiagon Fire That Almost Wasn’t at Upcoming4.me
 Essay by L E Modesitt Jr about The One-Eyed Man at Upcoming4.me
 The story behind Cyador's Heirs - Online Essay by L. E. Modesitt at Upcoming4.me
 The Immense Costs and a Shred of Optimism: A Conversation with L. E. Modesitt, Jr. at Clarkesworld Magazine
 Interview with L. E. Modesitt, Jr. at Boomtron.com

1943 births
Living people
20th-century American novelists
21st-century American novelists
American fantasy writers
American male novelists
American science fiction writers
Writers from Denver
Williams College alumni
American male short story writers
20th-century American short story writers
21st-century American short story writers
20th-century American male writers
21st-century American male writers
Novelists from Colorado
People from Cedar City, Utah